Perkinsea is a class of alveolates.

Taxonomy

Perkinsus is a genus in the class Perkinsea that is a parasite of bivalve molluscs; it displays a number of features characteristic of the dinoflagellates including laterally inserted heterodynamic flagella. However, it has been settled that Perkinsus does not belong into the phyla dinoflagellata, but rather into the phylum Perkinsozoa.

Two other genera have been described in this class — Cryptophagus (now renamed Rastrimonas) and Parvilucifera.

References

Perkinsozoa
Perkinsozoan classes